Raden Ajeng Kustiyah Wulaningsih Retno Edhi (1752–1838), better known as Nyi Ageng Serang, is a National Hero of Indonesia.

Biography
Nyi Ageng Serang was born under the name Raden Ajeng Kustiyah Wulaningsih Retno Edhi in Serang ( north of Solo), in 1752. Her father was Pangeran Natapraja (also known as Panembahan Serang), a ruler of Serang and Pangeran Mangkubumi's war commander. She was also a descendant of Sunan Kalijaga. The name Nyi Ageng Serang was given to her after her father lived of disease and she took over his position.

She helped her father to fight against the Dutch colonial government, which attacked them because her father still maintained troops, in violation of the Treaty of Giyanti. After the battle, she was arrested and taken to Yogyakarta. Then, she was sent back to Serang.

At the beginning of Diponegoro War in 1825, 73-year-old Nyi Ageng Serang commanded the force on a stretcher to help Pangeran Diponegoro fighting the Dutch. During the war, she was accompanied by her son-in-law, Raden Mas Pak-pak. She also became a war advisor. She fought in several areas, including Purwodadi, Demak, Semarang, Juwana, Kudus, and Rembang. She was also assigned to defend the area of Prambanan from the Dutch. One of her best-known strategies was the use of lumbu (green taro leaves) for disguise. Her forces attached the lumbu to poles to look like a taro orchard. She stopped fighting after 3 years, although her son-in-law continued fighting. Despite fighting the Dutch, beginning in 1833 they gave her an annuity of 100 gulden per month.

She died in Yogyakarta in 1838. Her remains were buried in Beku, Kulon Progo, Yogyakarta.

Legacy
Nyi Ageng Serang was awarded the title National Heroine of Indonesia through Presidential Decree number 084/TK/1974 on 13 December 1974. One of her grandsons, Raden Mas Soewardi Soerjaningrat, is also a national hero. Her name is used for the building of the Culture and Museum Office in South Jakarta.

References

Bibliography

1752 births
1838 deaths
National Heroes of Indonesia
Women in 19th-century warfare
Women in war in Indonesia